The GCR Class 11E was a type of 4-4-0 steam locomotive used by the Great Central Railway for express passenger services. Ten were built in the railway's own workshops at Gorton, Manchester during 1913; they remained in service until the mid-1950s.

History
In the early part of the 20th century, the Great Central Railway (GCR) had favoured the 4-4-0 wheel arrangement for express passenger services. They had bought 40 such locomotives to the design of their Locomotive Engineer, John G. Robinson (Robinson became Chief Mechanical Engineer in 1902), between 1901 and 1904, and these formed Class 11B. These were found to be too small, and subsequently several classes of 4-4-2 and 4-6-0 locomotive were introduced for express passenger trains, with the 4-4-2 type predominating. After the Class 1 4-6-0, which were larger than any of the others, proved disappointing, Robinson decided to reduce the size of these and designed a 4-4-0 which became Class 11E. Ten were built in 1913, and were immediately successful.

Compared to the Class 1 4-6-0, the omission of one coupled axle allowed a longer wheelbase between two adjacent axles of a 4-4-0 than with the 4-6-0, so the firebox could be positioned between the axles instead of on top of one of them; thus it could be deeper, giving better draughting which aided steaming. The shorter overall length meant that the boiler tubes were shorter, which also improved draughting.

Unusually, outside admission was used for the piston valves of the cylinders. Conventionally, piston valve locomotives had inside admission, whereas outside admission was used with slide valve locomotives. Outside admission gives a shorter exhaust passage, with the consequent advantages of a lower back pressure and sharper blast, but with the disadvantage that the valve spindle glands must be made to withstand much higher pressures and temperatures. Robinson had previously used outside admission for his Class 11D rebuilds from Class 11B, and the new class 11E used the same cylinder casting as those rebuilds. When further 4-4-0s of similar capability to class 11E were required after World War I, these were given normal cylinders with inside admission for the piston valves, and so were placed in Class 11F.

Withdrawal occurred between March 1953 and November 1955.

Accidents and incidents

Numbers and names

The original names were those of directors of the GCR; Sir Alexander Henderson was the chairman of the board, and William Purdon Viccars was deputy chairman. At the time, there were twelve members of the GCR Board; of these, two (Viscount Cross and Sir Alexander Henderson) already had locomotives named after them. However, the latter's name was removed from Class 11B No. 1014 and used on Class 11E No. 429, so one director was not honoured at this stage; this was rectified the following year when Class 1A 4-6-0 No. 439 was named Sutton Nelthorpe.

Two locomotives had their names altered subsequently, one of them twice. Sir Alexander Henderson was created Baron Faringdon in 1916, but his new name was used on a Class 9P 4-6-0, so in 1917 No. 429 was renamed Sir Douglas Haig after the Commander-in-Chief of the British Expeditionary Force. In turn, Sir Douglas was created Earl Haig in 1919 and his new name used on another Class 9P 4-6-0, so No. 429 was renamed a second time, becoming Prince Henry  after the fourth child of King George V. When Charles Stuart-Wortley was raised to the peerage as Baron Stuart of Wortley in 1917, his name was used on a further class 9P, so no. 437 was renamed Prince George  after the fifth child of King George V.

After the 1923 Grouping, the LNER increased the GCR numbers by 5000, this occurring in 1924–5. Under the 1946 renumbering, they became 2650–9 in the same order. During 1948–50, British Railways increased these numbers by 60000.

Notes

References

11E
4-4-0 locomotives
2′B h2 locomotives
Railway locomotives introduced in 1913
Scrapped locomotives
Standard gauge steam locomotives of Great Britain
Passenger locomotives